Omiodes grandis is a moth in the family Crambidae. It was described by Herbert Druce in 1902. It is found in Ecuador, Bolivia, French Guiana and Costa Rica.

References

Moths described in 1902
grandis